The 1953 Italian Grand Prix was a Formula Two race held on 13 September 1953 at Monza. It was the ninth and final race in the 1953 World Championship of Drivers, which was run to Formula Two rules in 1952 and 1953, rather than the Formula One regulations normally used. This made it the last World Championship race to run under the Formula Two regulations. The 80-lap race was won by Maserati driver Juan Manuel Fangio after he started from second position. Nino Farina finished second for the Ferrari team and his teammate Luigi Villoresi came in third.

Race report 
The initial part of the race was a four-way battle between Alberto Ascari, Giuseppe Farina, Juan Manuel Fangio and Onofre Marimón. With five drivers running together on the last lap, the race saw a spectacular finish with Ascari and Farina ahead of Fangio approaching the last corner. Ascari made a mistake and spun. To avoid him, Farina pulled to the grass but recovered later. Fangio pounced on this window of opportunity and took a famous win. Ascari claimed the World Championship for Drivers' for the second, and final, time.

Classification

Qualifying

Race 

Notes
 – Includes 1 point for fastest lap

Shared drive 
 Car #56: Mantovani (38 laps) then Musso (38 laps)

Championship standings after the race 
Drivers' Championship standings

Note: Only the top five positions are included. Only the best 4 results counted towards the Championship. Numbers without parentheses are Championship points; numbers in parentheses are total points scored.

References

Italian Grand Prix
Italian Grand Prix
1953 in Italian motorsport
Italian Grand Prix